Juan Gabriel Con El Mariachi Vargas De Tecalitlan is the fourth studio album by Mexican singer–songwriter Juan Gabriel with music performed by the mariachi band Vargas de Tecalitlán.  It was released in 1974. In 1977, Juan Gabriel made his film debut in Nobleza Ranchera alongside superstar Mexican actresses Sara García and Verónica Castro. Songs on this album were featured in the film.

Track listing

References 

Juan Gabriel albums
Mariachi albums
1974 albums
RCA Records albums